was king of the Ryūkyū Kingdom from 1802 to 1803.

Shō Sei was the only son of king Shō On. He was 2 years old when he succeeded his father on August 8 (Lunar calendar: the eleventh day of the seventh month), 1802, and died of smallpox one year later. After his death, his uncle Shō Kō was installed as the next king.

References
Chūzan Seifu, vol. 10

Second Shō dynasty
Kings of Ryūkyū
1800 births
1803 deaths
Deaths from smallpox